= Jat Khedi =

- village
- Location within Madhya Pradesh Location within India
- Coordinates: 23.1894407°N 77.2376414°E
- Country: India
- State: Madhya Pradesh
- District: Bhopal
- Tehsil: Huzur
- Elevation: 517 m (1,696 ft)

Population (2011)
  - Total: 219
- Time zone: UTC+5:30 (IST)
- ISO 3166 code: MP-IN
- 2011 census code: 482492

Jat Khedi is a village in the Bhopal district of Madhya Pradesh, India. It is located in the Huzur tehsil and the Phanda block.

== Demographics ==
According to the 2011 census of India, Jat Khedi has 37 households. The effective literacy rate (i.e. the literacy rate of population excluding children aged 6 and below) is 79.79%.

Demographics (2011 Census)
	Total	Male	Female
Population	219	113	106
Children aged below 6 years	26	15	11
Scheduled caste	108	58	50
Scheduled tribe	10	5	5
Literates	154	82	72
Workers (all)	87	60	27
Main workers (total)	58	56	2
Main workers: Cultivators	30	30	0
Main workers: Agricultural labourers	20	19	1
Main workers: Household industry workers	0	0	0
Main workers: Other	8	7	1
Marginal workers (total)	29	4	25
Marginal workers: Cultivators	8	0	8
Marginal workers: Agricultural labourers	20	4	16
Marginal workers: Household industry workers	1	0	1
Marginal workers: Others	0	0	0
Non-workers	132	53	79
